TeamGym is a form of competition created by the European Union of Gymnastics. The first official competition was held in Finland in 1996. Originally named EuroTeam, TeamGym received its current name in 2002. From 1996 to 2008, the European Championships was an event for clubs; since 2010 the competition is contested with national teams representing different countries. TeamGym events consist of three sections: women, men and mixed teams. Gymnasts perform skills in three different disciplines: floor, tumbling and trampette. In common for the performance is effective teamwork, good technique in the elements and spectacular acrobatic skills.

Events

Floor 
All members of the Team take part in the floor program, composed of a mixture of dance, flexibility and skill. The routine has to be skillfully choreographed and the judges look out for changes in shape. There needs to be at least two spins, two jumps/leaps, two acrobatic elements, two balance/power elements, two section elements and one combination of elements. These section elements are bodywaves for women's teams, power elements for men's teams and lifts for mixed teams. Floor routines are performed to music.

Trampet 

A trampet is a small square trampoline used in gymnastics. In TeamGym, the trampet is positioned at the end of a 25-meter-runway in front of a mat. The trampet is adjusted at an angle, tilted towards the gymnast, who approaches the trampet at a run. The gymnast jumps onto the trampet and performs a somersault, landing on the mat. Part of the TeamGym trampet program is performed with a vaulting apparatus, which is positioned between the trampet and the mat. 

Trampet programs are performed to music. Each team completes three consecutive rounds. During each round, six gymnasts perform one skill each. At least one round is performed using the vaulting table. The first round is usually the "team-round" where every gymnast competes the same skill. Each athlete closely follows the previous athlete without pause, making for a high-speed program. This is referred to as "streaming". At least two gymnasts have to be moving (usually one is running and the other one is about to take off from the trampet and perform an element) or else there will be a deduction of points made towards the team. 

Beginners usually start with simple jumps, such as the straight, tuck, star, straddle and pike jumps. Intermediate moves include tuck front, pike front, and straight front somersaults, while advanced moves include straight halves, straight fulls and doubles - with or without twists. Backward moves such as tuck backs or straight backs are not usually performed because the gymnast approaches the trampet at a forward run, making it difficult to land such moves.

Tumbling 
Again, here there are three runs (rounds) involved. One of which has to include all six gymnasts doing a forwards series. Another run also has to include the gymnasts completing the same move. Each series must have at least three different acrobatic elements.

European TeamGym Championships

The European TeamGym Championships, previously known as the Euroteam Championships, is a competition organized by the European Union of Gymnastics in the sport of TeamGym.

Championships and results

See also
 European Gymnastics Championships
 European Union of Gymnastics

References

External links
European Union of Gymnastics, TeamGym Disciplines

European TeamGym Championships external links 
 Men's results (archived)
 Women's results (archived)
 Mixed team results (archived)
 Medal count
 2014 results
 2016 results

Gymnastics
Trampolining